Marius Mădălin Oae (born 1 September 1983) is a Romanian former professional footballer who played as a midfielder. Oae started his career at Sportul Studențesc, for which played in the Liga I, then he played for Liga II sides Concordia Chiajna and Delta Tulcea, for German lower leagues Edenkoben and ended his career in 2014 after a short period spent at Liga III side Progresul Cernica.

References

External links
 
 

1983 births
Living people
Footballers from Bucharest
Romanian footballers
Association football midfielders
Liga I players
FC Sportul Studențesc București players
Liga II players
CS Concordia Chiajna players
FC Delta Dobrogea Tulcea players
Romanian expatriate footballers
Romanian expatriate sportspeople in Germany
Expatriate footballers in Germany